The Department of Justice and Public Safety in the Canadian province of New Brunswick was formed when Premier Brian Gallant restructured government departments in 2016.  It was a merger of all of the former Department of Public Safety with most of the former Department of Justice with the exception of the responsibilities for financial consumer services which transferred from Justice to the Department of Finance.  Public Safety had been created in an earlier restructuring project by the Bernard Lord government on March 23, 2000. Largely created from the former Department of the Solicitor General, it also took on responsibilities for road safety and driver's licenses from the Department of Transportation, liquor and lottery regulation from the Department of Finance and safety code monitoring from the Department of Municipalities.

The department is headed by a Minister of Justice and Public Safety who also continues to hold the title of Solicitor General of New Brunswick (French: Ministre de la Sécurité Publique et Solliciteur Général).

Ministers

References

External links
 Department of Public Safety

Public Safety
New Brunswick